"It's Over Now" is a song by American recording artist Luther Vandross released in 1985 as the second single from his album The Night I Fell in Love. The single was a top-five hit on Billboard’s Hot R&B Singles chart.

Charts

References

External links
 www.luthervandross.com

1985 songs
Luther Vandross songs
1985 singles
Songs written by Luther Vandross
Songs written by Marcus Miller
Epic Records singles